A well is an artificial excavation, hole or structure for the purpose of withdrawing an underground resource, usually water

Well may also refer to:

Structures

Used for resource extraction
 Castle well,  providing a protected source of drinking water
 Oil well, a hole drilled through the Earth's surface for the purpose of extracting petroleum oil
 Salt well, or brine well, used to mine salt
 Well drainage of agricultural land by pumped wells

Other structures
 Air well (condenser), a structure or device designed to promote the condensation of atmospheric moisture
 Clootie well, a place of pilgrimage in Celtic areas
 Holy well, often pagan sacred sites that were later Christianized
 Jacob's Well, of religious significance in the West Bank
 Lightwell, in architecture, an unroofed space designed to allow sunlight to reach interior areas
 Wishing well, a term from European folklore

Places
Well, Hampshire, England
Well, Lincolnshire, a village in England
Well, North Yorkshire, a village in England
Well, Gelderland, Netherlands
Well, Limburg, a village in the Netherlands
Well (Chinese constellation)

Arts, entertainment, and media

Music
Well..., 1994 album by Katey Sagal
...Well?, 1991 album by Swell
"Well", song by Little Richard from his 1967 album The Explosive Little Richard
"Well", song by Captain Beefheart and his Magic Band from their 1969 album Trout Mask Replica
"Well", song by The Olympics
"Well...," song by Frankie Goes to Hollywood from their 1984 album Welcome to the Pleasuredome

Other uses in arts, entertainment, and media
 Well (play), 2004 play by Lisa Kron
 Well (film), 2016 Hungarian film

Science and technology
 Well, the condition of having a high level of well-being
 Well, good health
 Gravity well or gravitational, a conceptual model of the gravitational field surrounding a body in space
 Potential well, a concept used in physics related to kinetic energy
 Quantum well, a potential well with only discrete energy values
 Well, a microtiter plate, used in chemistry and biochemistry

Other uses
 "Well,..." a catchphrase often used by former U.S. President Ronald Reagan
 Well drink, an alcoholic beverage made with liquor from a bartender's well
 Well Pharmacy, a British pharmacy chain
 The WELL, originally Whole Earth 'Lectronic Link, a virtual community
 "The Well", a nickname for the Scottish football team Motherwell F.C.
 The well of the court, part of the courtroom in some countries

See also
 The Well (disambiguation)
 Wellness (disambiguation)
 WELL (disambiguation)
 Wells (disambiguation)